Alpha Circini (α Cir, α Circini) is a variable star in the faint, southern, circumpolar constellation of Circinus. At an apparent visual magnitude of 3.19, it is the brightest star in the constellation and can be readily seen with the naked eye from the southern hemisphere.

This star belongs to a class of variables known as rapidly oscillating Ap stars. It oscillates with multiple, non-radial pulsation cycles and a dominant cycle of 6.8 minutes. The spectrum shows peculiar features caused by chemical stratification of the outer atmosphere. It displays a moderate deficiency of carbon, nitrogen and oxygen, while there is an overabundance of chromium (Cr). The stellar classification of A7 Vp SrCrEu indicates that this is a main sequence star with enhanced levels of strontium (Sr), chromium, and europium (Eu) in its atmosphere (compared to a typical star like the Sun).

The mass of Alpha Circini is about 150% to 170% the mass of the Sun and it has double the Sun's radius, while the luminosity is more than 10 times that of the Sun. The effective temperature of the outer envelope is about 7,500 K, giving it the white hue typical of A-type stars.

Based upon its location and motion through space, Alpha Circini is a candidate member of a stellar kinematic group known as the Beta Pictoris moving group. This group shares a common origin and has an estimated age of about 12 million years.

References

Circinus (constellation)
A-type main-sequence stars
Suspected variables
Circini, Alpha
Durchmusterung objects
128898
071908
5463
Circini, 17
Rapidly oscillating Ap stars